In 1989, 1. deild was the top tier league in Faroe Islands football (since 2005, the top tier has been the Faroe Islands Premier League, with 1. deild becoming the second tier). 

Statistics of 1. deild in the 1989 season.

Overview
It was contested by 10 teams, and B71 Sandoy won the championship.

League standings

Results

Top goalscorers

References

1. deild seasons
Faroe
Faroe
1